Theobald III may refer to:

 Theobald III, Count of Blois (1012–1089)
 Theobald III, Count of Champagne (1179–1201)